The Middle States Association of Colleges and Schools (Middle States Association or MSA) was a voluntary, peer-based, non-profit association that performed peer evaluation and regional accreditation of public and private schools in the Mid-Atlantic United States and certain foreign institutions of American origin. Prior to 2013, it comprised three separate commissions: 

 Middle States Commission on Higher Education (MSCHE)
 Middle States Commission on Elementary Schools (MSCES)
 Middle States Commission on Secondary Schools (MSCSS)

The higher education commission, MSCHE, and the other two commissions now operate independently. The MSCES and the MSCSS operate together as an organization sometimes known as the MSA-CESS. The accreditation of post-secondary schools by the MSCSS is limited to those that do not confer degrees or offer technical programs.

Region and scope
The "Middle States Commissions on Elementary and Secondary Schools" (M.S.A.-C.E.S.S.)  accredits "nearly" 2600 public and private schools and school systems throughout the United States and in more than 100 countries around the world.

MSA used to accredit colleges and universities through its higher education commission.  In 2013, that commission — the Middle States Commission on Higher Education — became a legally separate entity.

See also
Educational accreditation
United States Department of Education

References

School accreditors
College and university associations and consortia in the United States
Educational organizations based in the United States